Sodium channels are integral membrane proteins that form ion channels, conducting sodium ions (Na+) through a cell's membrane. They belong to the superfamily of cation channels and can be classified according to the trigger that opens the channel for such ions, i.e. either a voltage-change ("voltage-gated", "voltage-sensitive", or "voltage-dependent" sodium channel; also called "VGSCs" or "Nav channel") or a binding of a substance (a ligand) to the channel (ligand-gated sodium channels).

In excitable cells such as neurons, myocytes, and certain types of glia, sodium channels are responsible for the rising phase of action potentials. These channels go through three different states called resting, active and inactive states. Even though the resting and inactive states would not allow the ions to flow through the channels the difference exists with respect to their structural conformation.

Selectivity
Sodium channels are highly selective for the transport of ions across cell membranes. The high selectivity with respect to the sodium ion is achieved in many different ways. All involve encapsulation of the sodium ion in a cavity of specific size within a larger molecule.

Voltage-gated sodium channels

Structure 

Sodium channels consist of large alpha subunits that associate with proteins, such as beta subunits. An alpha subunit forms the core of the channel and is functional on its own. When the alpha subunit protein is expressed by a cell, it is able to form channels that conduct Na+ in a voltage-gated way, even if beta subunits or other known modulating proteins are not expressed. When accessory proteins assemble with α subunits, the resulting complex can display altered voltage dependence and cellular localization.

The alpha subunit has four repeat domains, labelled I through IV, each containing six membrane-spanning segments, labelled S1 through S6. The highly conserved S4 segment acts as the channel's voltage sensor. The voltage sensitivity of this channel is due to positive amino acids located at every third position. When stimulated by a change in transmembrane voltage, this segment moves toward the extracellular side of the cell membrane, allowing the channel to become permeable to ions. The ions are conducted through a pore, which can be broken into two regions. The more external (i.e., more extracellular) portion of the pore is formed by the "P-loops" (the region between S5 and S6) of the four domains. This region is the most narrow part of the pore and is responsible for its ion selectivity. The inner portion (i.e., more cytoplasmic) of the pore is formed by the combined S5 and S6 segments of the four domains. The region linking domains III and IV is also important for channel function. This region plugs the channel after prolonged activation, inactivating it.

Gating
Voltage-gated Na+ channels have three main conformational states: closed, open and inactivated. Forward/back transitions between these states are correspondingly referred to as activation/deactivation (between open and closed, respectively), inactivation/reactivation (between inactivated and open, respectively), and recovery from inactivation/closed-state inactivation (between inactivated and closed, respectively). Closed and inactivated states are ion impermeable.

Before an action potential occurs, the axonal membrane is at its normal resting potential, about −70 mV in most human neurons, and Na+ channels are in their deactivated state, blocked on the extracellular side by their activation gates. In response to an increase of the membrane potential to about −55 mV (in this case, caused by an action potential), the activation gates open, allowing positively charged Na+ ions to flow into the neuron through the channels, and causing the voltage across the neuronal membrane to increase to +30 mV in human neurons. Because the voltage across the membrane is initially negative, as its voltage increases to and past zero (from −70 mV at rest to a maximum of +30 mV), it is said to depolarize. This increase in voltage constitutes the rising phase of an action potential.

At the peak of the action potential, when enough Na+ has entered the neuron and the membrane's potential has become high enough, the Na+ channels inactivate themselves by closing their inactivation gates. The inactivation gate can be thought of as a "plug" tethered to domains III and IV of the channel's intracellular alpha subunit. Closure of the inactivation gate causes Na+ flow through the channel to stop, which in turn causes the membrane potential to stop rising. The closing of the inactivation gate creates a refractory period within each individual Na+ channel. This refractory period eliminates the possibility of an action potential moving in the opposite direction back towards the soma. With its inactivation gate closed, the channel is said to be inactivated. With the Na+ channel no longer contributing to the membrane potential, the potential decreases back to its resting potential as the neuron repolarizes and subsequently hyperpolarizes itself, and this constitutes the falling phase of an action potential. The refractory period of each channel is therefore vital in propagating the action potential unidirectionally down an axon for proper communication between neurons.

When the membrane's voltage becomes low enough, the inactivation gate reopens and the activation gate closes in a process called deinactivation. With the activation gate closed and the inactivation gate open, the Na+ channel is once again in its deactivated state, and is ready to participate in another action potential.

When any kind of ion channel does not inactivate itself, it is said to be persistently (or tonically) active. Some kinds of ion channels are naturally persistently active. However, genetic mutations that cause persistent activity in other channels can cause disease by creating excessive activity of certain kinds of neurons. Mutations that interfere with Na+ channel inactivation can contribute to cardiovascular diseases or epileptic seizures by window currents, which can cause muscle and/or nerve cells to become over-excited.

Modeling the behavior of gates
The temporal behavior of Na+ channels can be modeled by a Markovian scheme or by the Hodgkin–Huxley-type formalism. In the former scheme, each channel occupies a distinct state with differential equations describing transitions between states; in the latter, the channels are treated as a population that are affected by three independent gating variables. Each of these variables can attain a value between 1 (fully permeant to ions) and 0 (fully non-permeant), the product of these variables yielding the percentage of conducting channels. The Hodgkin–Huxley model can be shown to be equivalent to a Markovian model (Explain|date=September 2021)

Impermeability to other ions
The pore of sodium channels contains a selectivity filter made of negatively charged amino acid residues, which attract the positive Na+ ion and keep out negatively charged ions such as chloride. The cations flow into a more constricted part of the pore that is 0.3 by 0.5 nm wide, which is just large enough to allow a single Na+ ion with a water molecule associated to pass through. The larger K+ ion cannot fit through this area. Ions of different sizes also cannot interact as well with the negatively charged glutamic acid residues that line the pore.

Diversity
Voltage-gated sodium channels normally consist of an alpha subunit that forms the ion conduction pore and one to two beta subunits that have several functions including modulation of channel gating. Expression of the alpha subunit alone is sufficient to produce a functional channel.

Alpha subunits

The family of sodium channels has nine known members, with amino acid identity >50% in the trans-membrane segments and extracellular loop regions. A standardized nomenclature for sodium channels is currently used and is maintained by the IUPHAR.

The proteins of these channels are named Nav1.1 through Nav1.9. The gene names are referred to as SCN1A through SCN11A (the SCN6/7A gene is part of the Nax sub-family and has uncertain function). The likely evolutionary relationship between these channels, based on the similarity of their amino acid sequences, is shown in figure 1. The individual sodium channels are distinguished not only by differences in their sequence but also by their kinetics and expression profiles. Some of this data is summarized in table 1, below.

Beta subunits
Sodium channel beta subunits are type 1 transmembrane glycoproteins with an extracellular N-terminus and a cytoplasmic C-terminus. As members of the Ig superfamily, beta subunits contain a prototypic V-set Ig loop in their extracellular domain. They do not share any homology with their counterparts of calcium and potassium channels. Instead, they are homologous to neural cell adhesion molecules (CAMs) and the large family of L1 CAMs. There are four distinct betas named in order of discovery: SCN1B, SCN2B, SCN3B, SCN4B (table 2). Beta 1 and beta 3 interact with the alpha subunit non-covalently, whereas beta 2 and beta 4 associate with alpha via disulfide bond. Sodium channels are more likely to stay open at the subthreshold membrane potential when interacting with beta toxins, which in turn induces an immediate sensation of pain.

Role of beta subunits as cell adhesion molecules
In addition to regulating channel gating, sodium channel beta subunits also modulate channel expression and form links to the intracellular cytoskeleton via ankyrin and spectrin.
Voltage-gated sodium channels also assemble with a variety of other proteins, such as FHF proteins (Fibroblast growth factor Homologous Factor), calmodulin, cytoskeleton or regulatory kinases, which form a complex with sodium channels, influencing its expression and/or function.  Several beta subunits interact with one or more extracellular matrix (ECM) molecules. Contactin, also known as F3 or F11, associates with beta 1 as shown via co-immunoprecipitation. Fibronectin-like (FN-like) repeats of Tenascin-C and Tenascin-R bind with beta 2 in contrast to the Epidermal growth factor-like (EGF-like) repeats that repel beta2. A disintegrin and metalloproteinase (ADAM) 10 sheds beta 2's ectodomain possibly inducing neurite outgrowth.  Beta 3 and beta 1 bind to neurofascin at Nodes of Ranvier in developing neurons.

Ligand-gated sodium channels 
Ligand-gated sodium channels are activated by binding of a ligand instead of a change in membrane potential.

They are found, e.g. in the neuromuscular junction as nicotinic receptors, where the ligands are acetylcholine molecules. Most channels of this type are permeable to potassium to some degree as well as to sodium.

Role in action potential

Voltage-gated sodium channels play an important role in action potentials. If enough channels open when there is a change in the cell's membrane potential, a small but significant number of Na+ ions will move into the cell down their electrochemical gradient, further depolarizing the cell. Thus, the more Na+ channels localized in a region of a cell's membrane the faster the action potential will propagate and the more excitable that area of the cell will be. This is an example of a positive feedback loop. The ability of these channels to assume a closed-inactivated state causes the refractory period and is critical for the propagation of action potentials down an axon.

Na+ channels both open and close more quickly than K+ channels, producing an influx of positive charge (Na+) toward the beginning of the action potential and an efflux (K+) toward the end.

Ligand-gated sodium channels, on the other hand, create the change in the membrane potential in the first place, in response to the binding of a ligand to it.

Pharmacologic modulation

Blockers

Activators

The following naturally produced substances persistently activate (open) sodium channels:

 Alkaloid-based toxins
 aconitine
 batrachotoxin
 brevetoxin
 ciguatoxin
 delphinine
 some grayanotoxins, e.g., grayanotoxin I (other granotoxins inactive, or close, sodium channels)
 veratridine

Gating modifiers
The following toxins modify the gating of sodium channels:

 Peptide-based toxins
 μ-Conotoxin
 δ-Atracotoxin
 Scorpion venom toxins

pH modulation
Changes in blood and tissue pH accompany physiological and pathophysiological conditions such as exercise, cardiac ischemia, ischemic stroke, and cocaine ingestion. These conditions are known to trigger the symptoms of electrical diseases in patients carrying sodium channel mutations. Protons cause a diverse set of changes to sodium channel gating, which generally lead to decreases in the amplitude of the transient sodium current and increases in the fraction of non-inactivating channels that pass persistent currents. These effects are shared with disease-causing mutants in neuronal, skeletal muscle, and cardiac tissue and may be compounded in mutants that impart greater proton sensitivity to sodium channels, suggesting a role of protons in triggering acute symptoms of electrical disease.

Molecular mechanisms of proton block
Single channel data from cardiomyocytes have shown that protons can decrease the conductance of individual sodium channels. The sodium channel selectivity filter is composed of a single residue in each of the four pore-loops of the four functional domains. These four residues are known as the DEKA motif. The permeation rate of sodium through the sodium channel is determined by a four carboxylate residues, the EEDD motif, which make up the outer charged ring. The protonation of these carboxylates is one of the main drivers of proton block in sodium channels, although there are other residues that also contribute to pH sensitivity. One such residue is C373 in the cardiac sodium channel which makes it the most pH-sensitive sodium channel among the sodium channels that have been studied to date.

pH modulation of sodium channel gating
As the cardiac sodium channel is the most pH-sensitive sodium channel, most of what is known is based on this channel. Reduction in extracellular pH has been shown to depolarize the voltage-dependence of activation and inactivation to more positive potentials. This indicates that during activities that decrease the blood pH, such as exercising, the probability of channels activating and inactivating is higher more positive membrane potentials, which can lead to potential adverse effects. The sodium channels expressed in skeletal muscle fibers have evolved into relatively pH-insensitive channels. This has been suggested to be a protective mechanism against potential over- or under-excitability in skeletal muscles, as blood pH levels are highly susceptible to change during movement. Recently, a mixed syndrome mutation that causes periodic paralysis and myotonia in the skeletal sodium channel has been shown to impart pH-sensitivity in this channel, making the gating of this channel similar to that of the cardiac subtype.

pH modulation across the subtypes studied thus far
The effects of protonation have been characterized in Nav1.1-Nav1.5. Among these channels, Nav1.1-Nav1.3 and Nav1.5 display depolarized voltage-dependence of activation, while activation in Nav1.4 remains insensitive to acidosis. The voltage-dependence of steady-state fast inactivation is unchanged in Nav1.1-Nav1.4, but steady-state fast inactivation in Nav1.5 is depolarized. Hence, among the sodium channels that have been studied so far, Nav1.4 is the least and Nav1.5 is the most proton-sensitive subtypes.

Evolution 
A voltage-gated sodium channel is present in members of the choanoflagellates, thought to be the closest living, unicellular relative of animals. This suggests that an ancestral form of the animal channel was among the many proteins that play central roles in animal life, but which are thought to have evolved before multicellularity. The four-domain animal voltage-gated sodium channel likely evolved from a single-subunit ion channel, which was probably permeable for potassium ions, via a sequence of two duplication events. This model draws support from the fact that subunits I and III (and II and IV) group by similarity, suggesting that a two-channel intermediate generated from the first duplication existed long enough for divergence to occur between its two subunits. After the second duplication, the channel was left with two sets of similar domains. The resulting four-domain channel is thought to have been permeable primarily for calcium, and to have achieved sodium selectivity a number of times independently. After divergence from the invertebrates, the vertebrate lineage underwent two whole-genome duplications (WGDs), yielding a set of four sodium channel gene prologues in the ancestral vertebrate, all of which were retained. After the tetrapod/teleost split, the teleosts likely underwent a third WGD leading to the eight sodium channel prologues expressed in many modern fishes. The modern, ten-paralogue sodium gene complement of mammals is thought to have arisen from a series of parallel and nested duplications involving two of the four paralogues present in the ancestor of all tetrapods.

See also

References

External links 
 
 

Electrophysiology
Integral membrane proteins
Sodium channels